Krumovgrad is a town in Kardzhali Province in the south of Bulgaria, located in the Eastern Rhodopes on the banks of the river Krumovitsa. The majority of its population is ethnic Turks (70.1%), and with 27.3% ethnic Bulgarians. The town is named after the successful medieval Bulgarian ruler Krum, the name meaning 'city of Krum' in Bulgarian.

Municipality 
Krumovgrad is also the seat of Krumovgrad municipality (part of Kardzhali Province), which includes the following 78 villages:

References

External links 
 Informative web site about Krumovgrad

Towns in Bulgaria
Cities and towns in the Rhodopes
Populated places in Kardzhali Province